Double Exposures (A.K.A. Alibi Breaker) is a 1937 British crime film directed by John Paddy Carstairs and starring David Langton, Julien Mitchell and Ruby Miller. It was made at Shepperton Studios as a quota quickie.
(David Langton is credited under the name Basil Langton, his birth name being Basil Muir Langton-Dodds. He later changed his acting name to David as there was another actor called Basil Langton.)

Plot
Reporter Peter Bradfield (David Langton under the name Basil Langton) is fired from his newspaper for failing to deliver an interview with big businessman Hector Rodman (Julien Mitchell). Plucky Bradfield subsequently becomes a photographic equipment salesman, and accidentally takes photos of two men in conversation. Unbeknown to him, these men are the businessmen's lawyer and his secretary, and are plotting to embezzle a fortune in bonds from Rodman, and planning to frame his workshy son George (George Astley) for the crime.

Cast
 David Langton (under the name Basil Langton) as Peter Bradfield
 Julien Mitchell as Hector Rodman  
 Ruby Miller as Mrs. Rodman  
 Brian Buchel as Geoffrey Cranswick  
 Mavis Clair as Jill Rodman  
 Fred Withers as Allbutt  
 Ivor Barnard as Mather 
 George Astley as  George Rodman  
 Frank Birch as Kempton  
 Denis Cowles as Police Inspector

Critical reception
TV Guide called the film a "Negligible British effort"; while Nineacre called it a "Cheap but cheerful film, mainly due to Langton who plays a flippant gadabout town that populated these sorts of film."

References

Bibliography
 Low, Rachael. Filmmaking in 1930s Britain. George Allen & Unwin, 1985.
 Wood, Linda. British Films, 1927-1939. British Film Institute, 1986.

External links

1937 films
British crime films
1937 crime films
Films shot at Shepperton Studios
Films directed by John Paddy Carstairs
Films set in England
Quota quickies
Films scored by Jack Beaver
British black-and-white films
1930s English-language films
1930s British films